Harry Kelly may refer to:
 Harry Kelly (anarchist) (1871–1953), American anarchist
 Harry Kelly (basketball) (born 1961), American basketball player
 Harry Kelly (politician) (1898–1971), Governor of Michigan, 1943–1947
 Harry C. Kelly (1908–1976), American physicist

See also
 Harry Kelley (disambiguation)
Henry Kelly (disambiguation)
Harold Kelly (disambiguation)